The men's canoe sprint K-4 1,000 metres at the 2016 Olympic Games in Rio de Janeiro took place between 19 and 20 August at Lagoa Stadium.

The medals were presented by Danka Barteková, IOC member, Slovakia and Donald McKenzie, Board Member of the ICF.

It was the last appearance of the men's K-4 1000 metres. A shorter race, the men's K-4 500 metres, will be held at Tokyo 2020.

Competition format

The competition comprises heats, semifinals, and a final round. Heat winners advanced to the "A" final, with all other boats getting a second chance in the semifinals. The top three from each semifinal also advanced to the "A" final, and competed for medals. "B" final was held for the other semifinalists.

Schedule
All times are Brasilia Time (UTC-03:00)

Results

Heats
The fastest boat qualified for the final, remainder to a semi-final.

Heat 1

Heat 2

Semifinals
Three fastest boats in each semifinal qualified for the 'A' final, remainder for the 'B' final

Semifinal 1

Semifinal 2

Finals

Final B

Final A

References

Canoeing at the 2016 Summer Olympics
Men's events at the 2016 Summer Olympics